The 29th Filipino Academy of Movie Arts and Sciences Awards Night was held in 1981 in the Philippines.  This is for the Outstanding Achievements of the different films for the year 1980.

Awards

Major Awards
Winners are listed first and highlighted with boldface.

Special Awardee

References

External links
FAMAS Awards 

FAMAS Award
FAMAS
FAMAS